Luliang may refer to:
Lüliang Mountains (吕梁山), in Shanxi, China
Lüliang (吕梁市), city in Shanxi, China
Luliang County (陆良县), in Yunnan, China